America First Credit Union (AFCU) is a federally chartered credit union headquartered in Riverdale, Utah, United States.  America First was the sixth largest credit union in the United States in terms of total membership and eight largest credit union in assets in the U.S.

Description
 America First has 131 branch locations, more than 1 million members, and has over USD 11.713 billion in assets. America First is also a member of the CO-OP Network of ATMs which provides its members free ATM access to the network's almost 30,000 ATMs nationwide.

Eligibility for membership at America First is open to anyone who lives, works, worships, attends school, conducts business, or volunteers in any counties or cities within their field of membership in Utah, Idaho, Oregon, New Mexico, Arizona, and Nevada. Eligibility is also open to all those who live within a 12-mile radius of the Mesquite, Nevada, city post office and the members of the immediate family or household of an existing member or those eligible for membership, as well as owners, employees, suppliers and their employees, or associated companies and their employees involved in the food industry, an affiliated association, or select employee group in the state of Utah.

History
America First Credit Union was founded on March 16, 1939. It was established at Fort Douglas in Salt Lake City, Utah after 59 members of the National Federation of Federal Employees, Local No. 650, instituted the Fort Douglas Civilian Employees Credit Union. On June 23, 1947, the finance office of the U.S. Army at Fort Douglas was moved to the Utah General Distribution Depot in Ogden, Utah, and the credit union moved with it and renamed itself Federal Employees Credit Union. In 1960, with the addition of the Naval Supply Depot in Clearfield, Utah, the credit union was now affiliated with five Federal Government installations, the others being the Utah General Depot, Hill Air Force Base, Fort Douglas and the Internal Revenue Service Building in Ogden, Utah. Utah-chartered credit unions began serving anyone in the state and the credit union changed its name to America First Credit Union in 1984. This is the year when the credit union opened its membership to the public.

In 1994, it marketed residential mortgages with incentives such as no fees for first mortgage refinancing, a quarter-point reduction in the interest rate if payments were to be deducted automatically from an America First checking account, and a quarter-point reduction for mortgages of less than half the residence's appraised value.

Beginning in 1998, a series of legal and legislative restrictions were placed on America First Credit Union's field of membership and its ability to make business loans. In 2003, America First became federally chartered to protect its membership and serve its business members. In 2004, it opened its first branch in Summit County, Utah, since the federal charter allows it to serve that county as well.

In 2005, it announced that it would offer Small Business Administration loans to its members. In 2007, the credit union, many of whose members serve in the military, hosted Operation Best Wishes.

On August 12, 2009, America First acquired Las Vegas-based Community One Federal Credit Union following its closure by the National Credit Union Administration.

In June of 2018, America First announced it would be merging with the Arizona based Altier Credit Union, expanding to include Maricopa County within America First's field of membership.

In November of 2019, America First announced it would be merging with the Utah County based City Center Credit Union.

On March 14, 2022, America First opened its first branch in the state of New Mexico, following its approval to add several counties and cities in New Mexico to its field of membership in 2020.

Technology
In 1999, the credit union used Novell's NetWare.

In 2001, it began to offer wireless banking to its members using technology from SensCom Inc.

In 2006, it agreed to adopt Oracle Corporation's Siebel Branch Teller application to capture check information at the teller's terminal.

See also 
 America First Event Center, an indoor arena at Southern Utah University sponsored by the credit union
 America First Field, a soccer stadium in the Salt Lake City suburb of Sandy also sponsored by the credit union

References

External links
 

Credit unions based in Utah
Companies based in Utah
Banks established in 1939
1939 establishments in Utah
Weber County, Utah